Dixie Hills is a historic neighborhood of northwest Atlanta with a population of 1,756 (2010).

It is bordered:
on the north by Joseph E. Boone Blvd., across which are Center Hill and Grove Park
on the east by Whitaker Circle and Anderson Ave., across which are West Lake
on the south by I-20 across which is Florida Heights; and Penelope Neighbors 
on the west by the Harvel Homes Community and Westhaven

It has an active community with monthly neighborhood meetings and committee volunteers (a.k.a. Dixie Hills Community Civic Club).  The official community website for the Dixie Hills neighborhood is www.DixieHillsAtlanta.com

History
A historic West Atlanta Neighborhood since 1938.  Real estate developer Heman E. Perry developed Hunter Hills and Dixie Hills with contractor Herman Glass.

In 1960, Donald "Doc" Miller opened Miller's Dixie Hills Pharmacy. In 1965 he moved his business to what is now called South Downtown and changed the name to Miller's Rexall Drugs, today a quirky landmark known for its selection of hoodoo supplies.

During the long hot summer of 1967, when more than 100 race riots broke out around the country, Dixie Hills joined the rebellion for three nights after Kwame Turé (then Stokely Carmichael) addressed a protest over a youngster’s shooting by a black policeman.

In 1967, Atlanta historian Franklin Garrett described Dixie Hills as a small area of "small, neat, middle-class homes" of African Americans; "near the edge lies a large, low-rent, privately owned apartment complex which curves around a small shopping center". There were no swimming pools or shade trees or entertainment facilities. After a riot in June 1967, the city dedicated resources to build a path to Anderson Park, a baseball diamond and shower stalls; and to repairing streets and improving health inspections.

Government
Dixie Hills lies in NPU J.

Parks
 Anderson Park

Schools 
 Turner Middle School

People
Atlanta Child Murders prime suspect Wayne Williams was born and raised in Dixie Hills. Many of the victims disappeared from the neighborhood.

References

Neighborhoods in Atlanta